Lieutenant Alfred Douglas Douglas-Hamilton, 13th Duke of Hamilton and 10th Duke of Brandon TD, DL (6 March 1862 – 16 March 1940) was a Scottish nobleman and sailor.

Early life
Hamilton was born at Shanklin, Isle of Wight, in 1862, the son of Captain Charles Douglas-Hamilton (1808–1873). His grandfather, Augustus Hamilton, was a son of Charles Powell Hamilton, himself a grandson of James Hamilton, 4th Duke of Hamilton. As a young man, Hamilton was commissioned into the Royal Navy, and held the rank of lieutenant. He gained the reputation for being able to dive under the keels of the battleships on which he served, without any equipment, reappearing on the opposite side of the ship to the amazement of his crewmates. In 1888, his fourth cousin, William Douglas-Hamilton, 12th Duke of Hamilton, persuaded him to leave the navy. By then, he was the heir presumptive of the Duke, who had no son.

Inheritance
There was a serious possibility that Alfred Hamilton would provide a good match for the twelfth duke's daughter, Lady Mary, but such hopes were dashed in 1890, when Hamilton was partially paralysed by a rare tropical disease he had caught while overseas on his last tour of duty. Hamilton recovered and succeeded to the dukedom in 1895. 

While the new duke inherited all entailed property and assets from his cousin, as well as a £1 million debt secured on them, most of the unentailed Hamilton estates went to Lady Mary, who in 1906 married James Graham, 6th Duke of Montrose. The properties that left the Hamilton family at this time included Brodick Castle on Arran, which had been owned by the Hamiltons for 500 years.

One property that did not leave the family was Hamilton Palace, the main family seat. The new Duke was also heredity keeper of the Scottish Royal Household. However, the Duke offered the palace to the Royal Navy during the First World War for use as a hospital. Following the end of the war it was considered necessary to demolish, it due to subsidence, blamed on the family's own coal mines. Hamilton lived instead at Dungavel House, which had previously been a Hamilton shooting lodge on moorland close to Strathaven.

Hamilton was honorary lieutenant-colonel of the 4th Battalion, Highland Light Infantry.

He was also honorary colonel of the 6th Battalion, the Cameronians (Scottish Rifles).

Hamilton died shortly after his 78th birthday, on 16 March 1940 at the family's property in Dorset, Ferne House.

Marriage and issue
On 4 December 1901, at the parish church of Newton Tony, Wiltshire, Hamilton married Nina Mary Benita Poore, a daughter of Major Robert Poore. She was the founder of the Animal Defence and Anti-Vivisection Society.  They had four sons and three daughters:
 Douglas Douglas-Hamilton, 14th Duke of Hamilton
 Lady Jean Douglas-Hamilton
 George Douglas-Hamilton, 10th Earl of Selkirk
 Lady Margaret Douglas-Hamilton (the mother of Anneli Drummond-Hay)
 Lord Malcolm Douglas-Hamilton
 Lord David Douglas-Hamilton
 Lady Mairi Nina Douglas-Hamilton

Hamilton's sons made RAF history by all being of the rank of Squadron Leader or above at the outbreak of World War II.

References

Works cited

 
 Hamilton Palace: the Hamilton family at www.rcahms.gov.uk
 Burke's Peerage and Baronetage

External links

1862 births
1940 deaths
Deputy Lieutenants of Lanarkshire
113
110
10
Alfred Douglas-Hamilton, 13th Duke of Hamilton
People from Shanklin